Sir Herbert Bulkley Mackworth-Praed, 1st Baronet   (2 May 1841 – 21 November 1921), was a British landowner, magistrate, banker, benefactor and Conservative politician.

Mackworth-Praed was the second son of Bulkley John Mackworth-Praed, JP, of Owsden Hall, Suffolk, by his second wife Elizabeth FitzPatrick, eldest daughter of Patrick Persse FitzPatrick. His uncle was the poet Winthrop Mackworth Praed.

He was educated at Harrow. He was returned to Parliament for Colchester in 1874, a seat he held until 1880. He was also a Deputy Lieutenant and Justice of the Peace for Suffolk and served as High Sheriff of Suffolk in 1886. In 1905 he was created a baronet, of Owsden Hall in the Parish of Owsden and County of Suffolk. The following year he was given Royal licence to continue the use of the surname Praed in addition to that of Mackworth.

Mackworth-Praed died in November 1921, aged 80, and the baronetcy became extinct.

References

External links

1841 births
1921 deaths
Baronets in the Baronetage of the United Kingdom
Deputy Lieutenants of Suffolk
English justices of the peace
Conservative Party (UK) MPs for English constituencies
People educated at Harrow School
UK MPs 1874–1880